Peter Eisenman (born August 11, 1932) is an American architect. Considered one of the New York Five, Eisenman is known for his writing and speaking about architecture as well as his designs, which have been called high modernist or deconstructive.

Biography

Early life
Peter Eisenman was born to Jewish parents on August 11, 1932, in Newark, New Jersey. As a child, he attended Columbia High School located in Maplewood, New Jersey. He transferred into the architecture school as an undergraduate at Cornell University and gave up his position on the swimming team in order to commit full-time to his studies. He received a Bachelor of Architecture degree from Cornell, a Master of Architecture degree from Columbia University's Graduate School of Architecture, Planning and Preservation, and MA and PhD degrees from the University of Cambridge. He received an honorary degree from Syracuse University School of Architecture in 2007.

Career
He first rose to prominence as a member of the New York Five (also known as the Whites, as opposed to the Grays of Yale: Robert A.M. Stern, Charles Moore, etc.), five architects (Eisenman, Charles Gwathmey, John Hejduk, Richard Meier, and Michael Graves) some of whose work was presented at a CASE Studies conference in 1969. Eisenman received a number of grants from the Graham Foundation for work done in this period. These architects' work at the time was often considered a reworking of the ideas of Le Corbusier. Subsequently, the five architects each developed unique styles and ideologies, with Eisenman becoming more affiliated with Deconstructivism.

He currently teaches theory seminars and advanced design studios at the Yale School of Architecture.  He is Professor Emeritus at the Cooper Union School of Architecture.  Previously, he taught at the University of Cambridge, Harvard University, the University of Pennsylvania, Princeton University School of Architecture, and the Ohio State University. Peter Eisenman founded the Institute for Architecture and Urban Studies in 1967, serving as its Executive Director until 1981. After 50 years in academia, he is regarded as an influential teacher by generations of alumni/ae.

His professional work is often referred to as formalist, deconstructive, late avant-garde, late or high modernist, etc.  A certain fragmenting of forms visible in some of his projects has been identified as characteristic of an eclectic group of architects that were (self-)labeled as deconstructivists, and who were featured in an exhibition by the same name at the Museum of Modern Art.  The heading also refers to the storied relationship and collaborations between Peter Eisenman and post-structuralist thinker Jacques Derrida.

His writings have pursued topics including comparative formal analyses; the emancipation and autonomization of the discipline; and histories of Architects including: Giuseppe Terragni, Andrea Palladio, Le Corbusier and James Stirling. While he has been referred to as a polarizing figure, such antagonistic associations are likely prompted by Colin Rowe's 1972 criticism that the work pursues physique form of European modernism rather than the utopian social agendas or more recent accusations that Eisenman's work is "post-humanist"  (Perhaps because his references to the Renaissance are 'merely' formal).  While his apathy towards the recent "green" movement is considered polarizing or "out-of-touch", this architect-artist (with drawings held by major collections) was also an early advocate of computer-aided design.  Eisenman employed fledgling innovators such as Greg Lynn and Ingeborg Rocker as early as 1989. Despite these claims of polarity and autonomization, Eisenman has famously pursued dialogues with important cultural figures internationally.  These include his English mentor Colin Rowe, the Italian historian Manfredo Tafuri, George Baird, Fredric Jameson, Laurie Olin, Rosalind Krauss and Jacques Derrida.

His focus on "liberating" architectural form was notable from an academic and theoretical standpoint but resulted in structures that were both badly built and hostile to users. The Wexner Center, hotly anticipated as the first major public deconstructivist building, has required extensive and expensive retrofitting because of elementary design flaws (such as incompetent material specifications, and fine art exhibition space exposed to direct sunlight). It was frequently repeated that the Wexner's colliding planes tended to make its users disoriented to the point of physical nausea; in 1997 researcher Michael Pollan tracked the source of this rumor back to Eisenman himself. In the words of Andrew Ballantyne, "By some scale of values, he was actually enhancing the reputation of his building by letting it be known that it was hostile to humanity."

His House VI, designed for clients Richard and Suzanne Frank in the mid-1970s, confounds expectations of structure and function. Suzanne Frank was initially sympathetic and patient with Eisenman's theories and demands. But after years of fixes to the badly specified and misbegotten House VI (which had first broken the Franks' budget then consumed their life savings), Suzanne Frank was prompted to strike back with Peter Eisenman's House VI: The Client's Response, in which she admitted both the problems of the building, as much as its virtues.

He has also embarked on a larger series of building projects in his career, including the Memorial to the Murdered Jews of Europe in Berlin and the new University of Phoenix Stadium in Glendale, Arizona. His largest project to date is the City of Culture of Galicia in Santiago de Compostela, Spain. He is featured in wide print and many films, including the 30 minutes 2008 film Peter Eisenman: University of Phoenix Stadium for the Arizona Cardinals where he provides a tour of his recent construction. In 2001, he won the National Design Award for Architecture from the Cooper-Hewitt National Design Museum.

Buildings and works

Falk House (House II Eisenman), Hardwick, Vermont, 1969
House VI (Frank residence), Cornwall, Connecticut, Design: 1972.
Wexner Center for the Arts, Ohio State University, Columbus, Ohio, 1989
Nunotani building, Edogawa Tokyo Japan, 1991 
Greater Columbus Convention Center, Columbus, Ohio, 1993 
Aronoff Center for Design and Art, University of Cincinnati, Cincinnati, Ohio, 1996
City of Culture of Galicia, Santiago de Compostela, Galicia, Spain, 1999
Il giardino dei passi perduti, Castelvecchio Museum, Verona, 2004
Memorial to the Murdered Jews of Europe, Berlin, 2005
State Farm Stadium, Glendale, Arizona, 2006

Bibliography
Peter Eisenman, Houses of Cards. New York: Oxford University Press, 1987. 
Peter Eisenman, Diagram Diaries (Universe Architecture Series), Thames and Hudson, 1999. 
Blurred Zones: Investigations of the Interstitial : Eisenman Architects 1988-1998
Peter Eisenman, Giuseppe Terragni: Transformations, Decompositions, Critiques, New York, The Monacelli Press 2003 
Peter Eisenman, Eisenman Inside Out. Selected Writings 1963-1988, New Haven-London, Yale University Press 2004 
Peter Eisenman, Ten Canonical Buildings 1950-2000, New York, Rizzoli International Publications inc. 2008 
Peter Eisenman et al., Peter Eisenman: In dialogue with architects and philosopher (Vladan Djokić and Petar Bojanić (eds.)), Mimesis International. 2017, 
Peter Eisenman, Memory Games, Rizzoli. 1996 
 Peter Eisenman and Elisa Iturbe, lateness 2020, Princeton University Press.

Notes

References

 Interview: Peter Eisenman, Threshold, Rizzoli, 1983.
 Kari Jormakka, Interview with Peter Eisenman, Datutop 14, 1991.
 
 
 Pangalos P., Petridou V., The imprint of Eisenman, ed. Futura, Athens, 2013.
 Meier A., Peter Eisenman: Machine Critique de l'Architecture, ed. Infolio, Gollion (CH), 2019, 252p.

External links

 Eisenman Architects official website
 Finding aid for the Peter Eisenman fonds, Canadian Centre for Architecture (digitized items)
 Video interview with Eisenman from 1996
 Archinect.com interview
 designboom.com interview
 Eisenman's politics an interview with Robert Locke
 Eisenman in conversation with Iman Ansari
 "Contrasting Concepts of Harmony in Architecture: The 1982 Debate Between Christopher Alexander and Peter Eisenman"
 Eisenmania
 
Finding aid for Peter Eisenman architectural drawings for House VI, 1972. Getty Research Institute, Los Angeles. Accession No. 920049. Sixty-three architectural drawings in pencil, pen and marker on paper document the design development of House VI, one of Peter Eisenman's most important early polemical designs.

1932 births
Alumni of Trinity College, Cambridge
20th-century American architects
American architecture writers
20th-century American Jews
American male non-fiction writers
Architectural theoreticians
Columbia High School (New Jersey) alumni
Cornell University College of Architecture, Art, and Planning alumni
Columbia Graduate School of Architecture, Planning and Preservation alumni
Deconstructivism
Living people
Members of the American Academy of Arts and Letters
Jewish architects
Postmodern architects
Artists from Newark, New Jersey
National Design Award winners
Wolf Prize in Arts laureates
Yale School of Architecture faculty
Architecture educators
21st-century American architects
21st-century American Jews